Büyükkaracaören is a village in the Oğuzeli District, Gaziantep Province, Turkey. The village is inhabited by Turkmens of various tribes. It was known as Yüreğir in the 16th century.

References

Villages in Oğuzeli District